Dmitry Vitalyevich Mikhaylenko (born 28 February 2000) is a Russian football player. He plays for FC Veles Moscow.

Club career
He made his debut in the Russian Football National League for FC Veles Moscow on 6 March 2022 in a game against FC Akron Tolyatti.

References

External links
 
 
 
 Profile by Russian Football National League

2000 births
People from Orsk
Sportspeople from Orenburg Oblast
Living people
Russian footballers
Association football defenders
FC Nosta Novotroitsk players
FC Khimik Dzerzhinsk players
FC Veles Moscow players
Russian Second League players
Russian First League players